Mehran Mesbahi is an Iranian-American control theorist and aerospace engineer. He is a Professor of Aeronautics and Astronautics, and Adjunct Professor of Electrical Engineering and Mathematics at the University of Washington in Seattle. His research is on systems and control theory over networks, optimization, and aerospace controls.

Mehran Mesbahi earned his Ph.D. from the University of Southern California in June 1996. From July 1996 until December 1999, he was with the Guidance and Control Analysis Group of the Jet Propulsion Laboratory at California Institute of Technology. During this time, he also had appointments in the Department of Electrical Engineering- Systems at USC (1997–1998) and in the Department of Control and Dynamical Systems at Caltech (1998–1999). From January 2000 to July 2002, he was an Assistant Professor of Aerospace Engineering and Mechanics at the University of Minnesota-Twin Cities.

Honors and awards
 IEEE Fellow
 University of Washington College of Engineering Innovator Award, 2008
 University of Washington Distinguished Teaching Award, 2005
 NASA Space Act Award, 2004
 National Science Foundation CAREER Award, 2001

Selected publications 
 M. Mesbahi and  Magnus Egerstedt, Graph-theoretic Methods in Multiagent Networks, Princeton University Press, 2010.
 A. Rahmani, M. Ji, M. Mesbahi, and M. Egerstedt. Controllability of multi-agent systems from a graph theoretic perspective, SIAM Journal on Control and Optimization, 48 (1): 162-186, 2009.
 M. Mesbahi. On state-dependent dynamic graphs and their controllability properties, IEEE Transactions on Automatic Control (50) 3: 387- 392, 2005.
 Y. Hatano and M. Mesbahi. Agreement over random networks, IEEE Transactions on Automatic Control, (50) 11: 1867-1872, 2005.
 M. Mesbahi and F. Y. Hadaegh. Formation flying of multiple spacecraft via graphs, matrix inequalities, and switching, AIAA Journal of Guidance, Control, and Dynamics, (24) 2: 369-377, 2001.

References

External links 
 Homepage
 RainLab
 Mathematics Genealogy Project profile

Control theorists
Living people
USC Viterbi School of Engineering alumni
University of Minnesota faculty
University of Washington faculty
Fellow Members of the IEEE
Year of birth missing (living people)